Camilla Townsend (born January 29, 1965) is an American historian and professor of history at Rutgers University. She specializes in the early history of Native Americans in the United States, as well as in the history of Latin America. Her 2019 book, Fifth Sun, won the 2020 Cundill History Prize.

Education and career 
Townsend attended Stuyvesant High School in New York City. She graduated summa cum laude from Bryn Mawr College and received a Ph.D. in comparative history from Rutgers University. From 1995 to 2006 she taught history at Colgate University in Hamilton, New York. While teaching at Colgate, she enrolled in a summer course of Classical Nahuatl offered at Yale and became aware of how many primary and secondary sources were available in Nahuatl. She is now a distinguished professor of history at Rutgers University.

In 2010, she was awarded a Guggenheim Fellowship. During this time, she analyzed the Nahuatl historical annals from the 16th and 17th centuries, written by the Nahuas (or Aztecs) in their own language, using the Latin alphabet taught to them by Spanish friars for the purpose of reading the Bible to more easily convert them to Christianity. Townsend describes these writings, written without Spanish oversight unlike the Florentine Codex, as a "written-down history by Nahua for Nahua children". These writings, known as annals, or anales in Spanish, after the genre of medieval European writing which were believed to be similar, were effectively transcriptions of narrations of the pictographic texts in which the glyphs served as mnemonic devices. These texts were considered dubious sources by Western readers and historians for many years, in part because of their lack of overt chronicity and contradictory repetition. However, the repetition of the same story within the annals represented a way of Aztec history-telling, in which a series of speakers presented their own perception of an event, a battle, a marriage, etc. The translation of these polyphonous annals, written by the sons and grandsons of those alive during the Spanish invasion who remembered their youth as well of the stories of their ancestors, formed the basis for Townsend's book Fifth Sun: A New History of the Aztecs.
Of course, scholars must be scrupulous and thorough. But I think young historians should also learn some lessons from the greatest fiction writers and most talented detectives. Close your eyes from time to time. Let your mind roam among all the evidence you have. Make the leap— Try to imagine the world as it was then. It will be worth the effort.

Selected publications

Books 

 Tales of Two Cities: Race and Economic Culture in Early Republican North and South America (Texas, 2000)
 Pocahontas and the Powhatan Dilemma (Hill & Wang, 2004)
 Malintzin's Choices: An Indian Woman in the Conquest of Mexico (New Mexico, 2006); translated Malintzin: Una mujer indígena en la Conquista de México (Ediciones Era, Mexico, 2015)
 American Indian History: A Documentary Reader (Wiley-Blackwell, 2009)
 Here in This Year: Seventeenth-Century Nahuatl Annals of the Tlaxcala-Puebla Valley (Stanford, 2010)
 Annals of Native America: How the Nahuas of Colonial Mexico Kept Their History Alive (Oxford University Press, 2016)
 Fifth Sun: A New History of the Aztecs (Oxford University Press, 2019)
Indigenous Life After the Conquest: The De la Cruz Family Papers of Colonial Mexico, with Caterina Pizzigoni (Penn State University Press, 2021)

References

External links
Faculty page

1965 births
Living people
Rutgers University faculty
Colgate University faculty
Rutgers University alumni
American women historians
21st-century American historians
21st-century American women
Historians from New York (state)
Aztec scholars
Bryn Mawr College alumni
Stuyvesant High School alumni